Swimming contests were held at the 2015 Parapan American Games from August 8 to 14 at the CIBC Aquatics Centre in Toronto, Canada.

Medal table

Medalists

Men's events

Women's events

Mixed events

Relay

References

 
Events at the 2015 Parapan American Games
Parapan American Games